Spinicalliotropis solariellaformis is a species of sea snail, a marine gastropod mollusk in the family Eucyclidae.

Description

Distribution
It can be found off the island Réunion.

References

 Vilvens C. (2007) New records and new species of Calliotropis from Indo-Pacific. Novapex 8 (Hors Série 5): 1–72

External links
 Kano, Y.; Chikyu, E.; Warén, A. (2009). Morphological, ecological and molecular characterization of the enigmatic planispiral snail genus Adeuomphalus (Vetigastropoda: Seguenzioidea. Journal of Molluscan Studies. 75(4): 397-418

solariellaformis
Gastropods described in 2006